Plattville is a village in Lisbon Township, Kendall County, Illinois, United States, west of Joliet. As of the 2010 census it had a population of 242. The community was established in 1860 and named after founder Daniel Platt, who first built a home there in 1834 on the Frink and Walker stagecoach route between Chicago and Ottawa.

Plattville was officially incorporated in March 2006 and had an estimated population of 245 in 2007. Plattville's first mayor was George "Jerry" Friel, who died in 2009. He was instrumental in his role in incorporating the village of Plattville in the mid-2000s, and spent some of his own money to file the town's incorporation papers.

Geography
The village is part of the Chicago metropolitan area. Yorkville lies to the north, and Lisbon lies to the southwest.

Demographics
In 2010, the village was 94.6 percent White, 5 percent Hispanic, and 0.4 percent Two or more races.

References

Villages in Kendall County, Illinois
Villages in Illinois
Populated places established in 1860
1860 establishments in Illinois